Messapian may refer to:

Messapians, an Iapygian tribe which inhabited Apulia in classical antiquity
Messapian language, spoken by the Iapygian tribes
An inhabitant of Messapia, Greece

Language and nationality disambiguation pages